Pietro Valentini (6 March 1619 – 28 November 1687) was a Roman Catholic prelate who served as Bishop of Sovana (1685–1687).

Biography
Pietro Valentini was born in Montalcino, Italy on 6 March 1619 and ordained a priest on 15 June 1647. On 9 April 1685, he was appointed Bishop of Sovana by Pope Innocent XI. On 23 April 1685, he was consecrated bishop by Alessandro Crescenzi (cardinal), Cardinal-Priest of Santa Prisca, with Diego Petra, Archbishop of Sorrento, and Pier Antonio Capobianco, Bishop Emeritus of Lacedonia, serving as co-consecrators.

He served as Bishop of Sovana until his death in November 1687.

References

External links and additional sources
 
 (for Chronology of Bishops) 
 (for Chronology of Bishops) 

17th-century Italian Roman Catholic bishops
Bishops appointed by Pope Innocent XI
1619 births
1687 deaths